This is a list of Armenian business people.

Aerospace and aviation
 Eduardo Eurnekian, owner of airports in Argentina, and Yerevan Airport
 Artem Mikoyan, founder of Mikoyan, MiG
 Mikhail Pogosyan, CEO of Sukhoi Design Bureau, and MiG Russian fighter jets manufacturer

Architects
 Vardan Harutyunyan, architect and owner of Mossessian & Partners, London

Banking, finance, insurance and investment banking

Russia
 Ruben Aganbegyan, CEO of Russia of Renaissance Capital, president of Micex
 Ashot Egiazaryan, banker; deputy of the Russian State Duma
 Samvel Karapetyan, founder and President of Tashir Group
 Ruben Vardanian, CEO and Chairman of Troika Dialog Group

United States
 Charles A. Agemian, former Executive Vice President of Chase Manhattan Bank
 Granger K. Costikyan, longtime partner of Brown Brothers Harriman
 Richard Donchian, pioneer Wall Street financier
 Mary Ellen Iskenderian, CEO and President of Women's World Banking and former senior executive of World Bank
 Steven A. Kandarian, former Executive Vice President and Chief Investment Officer of MetLife
 Paul Kazarian, hedge fund manager
  Kirk Kerkorian, businessman, investor, and philanthropist, billionaire, the president and CEO of Tracinda Corporation, 10th largest donor in the US, He was bestowed the title of National Hero of Armenia, the highest state award. 
 Robert Mehrabian, board member of Bank of New York Mellon

Entrepreneurs

General
 Noubar Afeyan, co-founder of the biotechnology company Moderna
 Arsen Borysovych Avakov, Governor of Kharkov region (2005–2010) and businessman in Ukraine, Minister of Internal Affairs of Ukraine (2014–present)
 Ian Bremmer, President of Eurasia Group
 Gerard Cafesjian, businessman, private investor and former board member of West Publishing
 Catchick Paul Chater, businessman in Hong Kong
 Larry Gagosian, founder of Gagosian Gallery
 Sergey Galitsky, Russian retail operator, Magnit
 Paul Garmirian, founder and owner of P.G. Cigars
 Arsen Gasparyan, former Armenian press secretary, publisher and cigar manufacturer
 Rafi Haladjian, founder of FranceNet internet service provider
 Kevork Hovnanian, Chairman of Hovnanian Enterprises; homebuilder
 Ernest Kocharyan, Canadian-Armenian businessman
 Samvel Karapetyan, owner of Tashir
 Kirk Kerkorian, investor
 Alex Manoogian, founder of Masco
 Matild Manukyan, businesswoman; real estate
 Armen Sarkissian, Chairman of Knightsbridge Group, former Prime Minister of Armenia
 David Shakarian, founder of GNC
 Artyom Tarasov, Russian businessman, the first officially declared millionaire in the USSR
 Carl Tchilinghiryan, German-Armenian businessman and entrepreneur, co-founder of Tchibo
 Gagik Tsarukian, businessman in Armenia
 Daniel Ustian, Chairman of Navistar
 Hrant Vardanyan, businessman in Armenia; founder and Chairman of Grand Holding
 Avedis Zildjian, founder of Zildjian
 Leonid Dovladbegyan, entrepreneur, top manager, venture capitalist

High technology
 Andrey Andreev, founder and owner of Badoo
 Boris Babayan, founder of MCST
 Alexis Ohanian, internet entrepreneur, co-founder of Reddit
 Avie Tevanian, former CTO of Apple and creator of OS X operating system, partner at Elevation Partners
 Hovhannes Avoyan, co-founder and CEO of PicsArt
 Souren Khetcho, entrepreneur, founder of OpenAuto and Vocally

Oil and gas
 Calouste Gulbenkian, one of the founders of Royal Dutch Shell, oil magnate
 Alexander Mantashev, oil magnate, industrialist, financier, and philanthropist

Executives
 Carole Black, CEO and President of Lifetime Entertainment
 Eduardo Eurnekian, President of Aeropuertos Argentina 2000
 Vartan Gregorian, President of Carnegie Corporation
 Ron Hovsepian, non-executive Chairman of the Board of Ann Taylor and CEO and President of Novell
 Vahan Janjigian, Senior Vice President of Forbes
 Steven A. Kandarian, CEO and President of MetLife
 Tigran Khudaverdyan, deputy CEO of Yandex
 Robert Mehrabian, board member of CME Group and Bank of New York Mellon
 Tro Piliguian, Chairman of Ogilvy and COO of WPP
 Eduard Sarkisov, Vice-President of Rusneft
 Roger Tatarian, former editor-in-chief and Executive VP of United Press International
 Serge Tchuruk, former Chairman of Alcatel

Fashion
 Patricia Field, US fashion designer
 Francis Kurkdjian, owner of perfume house Maison Francis Kurkdjian
 Alain Mikli, designer
 Carolyn Rafaelian, founder and owner of accessories and jewelry company Alex and Ani
 Valerie Toranian, Editor in Chief (French Edition) of Elle

Film and television industry

Argentina
 Martín Karadagián, Argentine actor

Russia
 Lev Atamanov, director of Soyuzmultfilm
 Anna Melikian, director, owner of Magnum Studios
 Armen Oganesyan, CEO of Voice of Russia
 Karen Shakhnazarov, CEO of Mosfilm
 Margarita Simonyan, Editor-in-chief of RT (formerly Russia Today)

United States
 Alex Yemenidjian, former CEO and Chairman of MGM Studios

Lawyers
 Mark Geragos, defense attorney who defended Michael Jackson
 Robert Kardashian, defense attorney who defended O. J. Simpson
 Karinna Moskalenko, Russian human rights lawyer

Sports
 Henrikh Mkhitaryan, professional footballer; midfielder for English Premier League team Manchester United and captain of the Armenia national team
 Yura Movsisyan, professional footballer; forward for Major League Soccer team Real Salt Lake and of the Armenia national team
 Nikita Simonyan, First Vice-President of the Russian Football Union

Video game and software industry
 Greg Costikyan, game designer
 Alex Seropian, founder of Bungie and developer of the Halo video game series

References

Lists of businesspeople
Businesspeople